This is a list of regencies and cities in West Java province. As of October 2019, there were 18 regencies and 9 cities.

External links 

 
 
Regencies, Indonesia
Regencies and cities